Whatever It May Take is the second studio album released by German heavy metal band Heaven Shall Burn.

Track listing

Personnel 
Production and performance credits are adapted from the album liner notes.

 Heaven Shall Burn
 Marcus Bischoff – lead vocals
 Patrick Schleitzer – guitars
 Maik Weichert – guitars
 Eric Bischoff – bass
 Matthias Voigt – drums

 Production
 Patrick W. Engel – recording, mixing, mastering, bass
  – layout

Additional musicians
 Johannes Formella (The Destiny Program) – additional vocals on "Casa de Caboclo"
 André Moraweck (Maroon) – additional vocals on "Casa de Caboclo"

References

External links 

2002 albums
Heaven Shall Burn albums